Harry G. Menhorn, Jr. (August 16, 1921 – March 10, 2008) was a former Democratic member of the Pennsylvania House of Representatives. He was a Ross commissioner for 12 years and a state legislator for one year. He died of cancer on March 10, 2008.

References

Democratic Party members of the Pennsylvania House of Representatives
2008 deaths
1921 births
20th-century American politicians
Politicians from Cumberland, Maryland